Nishiki is the Japanese word for "brocade" (see Saga Nishiki). Nishiki may also refer to:

Companies
Nishiki (bicycle company), initially a U.S. marketed bicycle brand, made in Japan by Kawamura

Fictional characters
 Kamen Rider Nishiki, A character from Kamen Rider Hibiki
 Nishiki Nakajima, a fictional character from the anime/manga series Strike Witches
 Akira Nishikiyama (often nicknamed "Nishiki"), a character from the Yakuza (series) games
Nishiki Nishio, a character from manga/anime series Tokyo Ghoul

Food
 Yamada Nishiki, famous rice for brewing sake
 Nishiki rice, a California medium grain rice

People
 Niimi Nishiki
, Japanese composer

Places
 Nishiki, Akita
 Nishiki, Kumamoto
 Nishiki, Yamaguchi
 Nishiki Market, a famous marketplace in downtown Kyoto
 Nishiki River
 Nishiki Station

See also
 Nishiki-e

Japanese-language surnames